The Springbok Solar Farm is a 443 MWp (350 MWAC) photovoltaic power station in the northwestern Mojave Desert, near California City in eastern Kern County, California.  The facility was developed and constructed by 8minutenergy Renewables in three phases. It is among the country's largest PV solar farms with a capacity of about 440 MWp (350 MWAC).

Facility details 

The project was developed by 8minutenergy, the largest independent solar power developer in the United States.   The three Springbok solar facilities combined generate enough clean, renewable energy to serve more than 152,000 households. The amount of greenhouse gas emissions avoided is comparable to removing nearly 150,000 cars from the road.  The power from all three projects is contracted to the Los Angeles Department of Water and Power.

Project units
The Springbok Solar Farm consists of 3 project units, or construction phases:

Springbok 1 Solar Project — a 137 MWdc (105 MWAC) solar power station using photovoltaics. Construction on the  site began in 2015 and was completed in July 2016.
 Springbok 2 Solar Project — a 191 MWdc (155 MWAC) solar power station also using photovoltaics which was completed in September 2016 on an additional 700 acres.
 Springbok 3 Solar Project — a 115 MWdc (90 MWAC) solar power station using photovoltaics completed in July 2019.

Electricity production 

Springbok Solar 1 nameplate capacities:  137 MWdc, 105 MWac 
annual net output: 299 GW·h (avg 2017)   capacity factor: 32.5%

Springbok Solar 2 nameplate capacities:  191 MWdc, 155 MWac 
annual net output: 418 GW·h (avg 2017)   capacity factor: 30.8%

See also

Beacon Solar Project
Solar power plants in the Mojave Desert
Solar power in California

References 

Solar power in the Mojave Desert
Buildings and structures in Kern County, California
Solar power stations in California
Photovoltaic power stations in the United States